Winchu Q'asa (Quechua winchu magnetite, q'asa mountain pass, "magnetite pass", Hispanicized spelling Huinchujasa) is a mountain in the Chunta in the Andes of Peru, about  high. It is situated in the Huancavelica Region, Huancavelica Province, Nuevo Occoro District. Winchu Q'asa lies southwest of Puka Q'asa, southeast of Tipiqucha and northeast of Q'iru Pinqullu.

References

Mountains of Huancavelica Region
Mountains of Peru